Paweł Chrupałła (born 16 March 2003 in Szprotawa) is a professional footballer who plays as a forward for Polish club Wisła Płock, on loan from Rosenborg. Born in Poland, he has represented both Poland and Norway as a youth international.

Club career

Chrupałła joined Rosenborg's academy from Fredrikstad ahead of the 2020 season. At the end of the year, he signed his first professional contract.

In the second half of 2021, Chrupałła was loaned out to first division team Stjørdals-Blink for the remainder of the season. However, after appearing in just one fixture, an injury prevented him from playing more. 
 
Chrupałła made his Rosenborg debut in June 2022, when he came on against Levanger in the Norwegian Cup. A few days later, he made his league debut, coming on against Kristiansund.

On 23 July 2022, Chrupałła scored his first goal for Rosenborg on a free kick in a league match against Tromsø.

In August 2022, he was sent out on loan to Kristiansund until the end of 2023.

On 23 December 2022, Chrupałła was loaned out again, joining Polish Ekstraklasa club Wisła Płock beginning on 1 January 2023 until the end of the year, with an option to make the move permanent.

Career statistics

Club

References

External links
 

2003 births
Living people
People from Szprotawa
Norwegian footballers
Polish footballers
Polish emigrants to Norway
Norwegian people of Polish descent
Naturalised citizens of Norway
Association football forwards
Rosenborg BK players
IL Stjørdals-Blink players
Kristiansund BK players
Wisła Płock players
Norwegian First Division players
Eliteserien players

Poland youth international footballers
Norway youth international footballers